Gina Gaston (born January 14, 1966, in Oxnard, CA) is a television journalist and currently the lead anchor for KTRK-TV in Houston, Texas.

Career
She joined channel 13 in 1992 to anchor the morning newscast with Tom Koch. She then left in 1999 to co-anchor HomePage, an afternoon show on MSNBC, with Ashleigh Banfield and Mika Brzezinski. Entertainment Weekly described the trio as "the Powerpuff Girls of journalism". Gaston left MSNBC in 2000. In 2001, she returned to channel 13 to anchor and report the 6 and 10pm newscast, replacing long-time anchor Shara Fryer. Prior to joining KTRK-TV, she worked at WTSP in Tampa, Florida, WHTM-TV in Harrisburg, Pennsylvania, and KLTV in Tyler, Texas.

Awards and honors
Gaston won a 2007 Lone Star Emmy Award for Outstanding Achievement for a documentary. She won a 2007 National Headliner Award as well for a documentary titled Soulful Stitches. She has also won several Associated Press awards. Gaston is a 1987 graduate of the University of Southern California.

Personal life
Gaston is married to former Houston Rockets player Mario Elie. In 2003, Gina gave birth to triplets—two boys and one girl.

References

1966 births
Living people
African-American journalists
American women television personalities
People from Houston
Journalists from Texas
20th-century American journalists
20th-century African-American people
21st-century African-American people
20th-century African-American women
21st-century African-American women
Television anchors from Houston
Television personalities from Texas